Borgo San Martino is a comune (municipality) in the Province of Alessandria in the Italian region Piedmont, located about  east of Turin and about  northwest of Alessandria.

Borgo San Martino borders the following municipalities: Casale Monferrato, Frassineto Po, Occimiano, Pomaro Monferrato, and Ticineto.

References

Cities and towns in Piedmont